The Bucharest Ring was a street circuit in the Romanian capital city of Bucharest and was initiated by City Challenge GmbH.

Designed by famed track designer Hermann Tilke, the circuit was in the city centre, and has the Palace of the Parliament in its infield.

The circuit held two FIA GT meetings in 2007 and 2008, but the 2009 event was cancelled due to financial reasons and the series never returned to the circuit. It was announced in September 2010 that the circuit would host a round of the Auto GP championship in July 2011, with the event being known as the Bucharest GP. However, this event was cancelled too.

Lap records 

The official race lap records at the Bucharest Ring are listed as:

Races hosted
The Bucharest Ring hosted the following competitions between 2007 and 2008:
 the FIA GT Championship
 the British Formula Three Championship
 the FIA GT3 European Championship
 the Dacia Logan Cup
 and was planned to host a 2007 GP Masters race

References

External links
Former Official Webpage

Sport in Bucharest
Motorsport venues in Romania
Racing circuits designed by Hermann Tilke
2007 establishments in Romania